Chardakhly may refer to:
Çardaqlı (disambiguation), places in Azerbaijan
Çardaqlar (disambiguation), places in Azerbaijan